This article show all participating team squads at the 2005 FIVB Volleyball World League, played by 12 countries from 27 May to 10 July 2005. The Final Round was held in Belgrade, Serbia and Montenegro.

The following is the  roster in the 2005 FIVB Volleyball World League.

The following is the  roster in the 2005 FIVB Volleyball World League.

The following is the  roster in the 2005 FIVB Volleyball World League.

The following is the  roster in the 2005 FIVB Volleyball World League.

The following is the  roster in the 2005 FIVB Volleyball World League.

The following is the  roster in the 2005 FIVB Volleyball World League.

The following is the  roster in the 2005 FIVB Volleyball World League.

The following is the  roster in the 2005 FIVB Volleyball World League.

The following is the  roster in the 2005 FIVB Volleyball World League.

The following is the  roster in the 2005 FIVB Volleyball World League.

The following is the  roster in the 2005 FIVB Volleyball World League.

The following is the  roster in the 2005 FIVB Volleyball World League.

References

External links
Official website

2006
2005 in volleyball